Maxine Baker (July 26, 1898 – January 28, 1994) was an American politician. She served as a Democratic member of the Florida House of Representatives from 1963 to 1972, representing Miami-Dade County, Florida. She is the namesake of the Baker Act, also known as the Florida Mental Health Act. 2

References
 2. 'Making Modern Florida'  University Press of Florida 2016  Mary Adkins

   Maxine Baker was on Florida Governor Leroy Collin's Special Constitutional Advisory Committee (SPAC) in 1958 as a prominent Dade County representative of the League Of Women Voters.  Many in Florida wanted to finally revise the old FL State Constitution of 1885.  She was a progressive force in advocating for county home rule, reapportionment, and particularly for  desegregation of public schools.  These changes eventually were incorporated into the 1968 revised FL Constitution.  2

1898 births
1994 deaths
People from College Park, Maryland
People from Miami-Dade County, Florida
Radcliffe College alumni
Democratic Party members of the Florida House of Representatives
Women state legislators in Florida
20th-century American politicians
20th-century American women politicians